Antoine Abang (born 18 June 1941) is a Cameroonian boxer. He competed in the middleweight boxing competition at the 1968 Summer Olympics.

References

1941 births
Living people
Boxers at the 1968 Summer Olympics
Cameroonian male boxers
Olympic boxers of Cameroon
People from Bamenda
Middleweight boxers
20th-century Cameroonian people